15 Draconis is a single star in the northern circumpolar constellation of Draco, located 452 light years away from the Sun. 15 Draconis is the Flamsteed designation; it also has the Bayer designation i Draconis. This object is visible to the naked eye as a white-hued star with an apparent visual magnitude of 4.94. It is moving closer to the Earth with a heliocentric radial velocity of −7 km/s.

This star has a stellar classification of A0 III, matching that of an A-type giant star. It has a relatively high rate of spin with a projected rotational velocity of 154 km/s. The star is radiating 286 times the Sun's luminosity from its photosphere at an effective temperature of 9,980 K.

References

A-type giants
Draco (constellation)
Draconis, 15
Draconis, A
Durchmusterung objects
149212
080650
6161